Anders Adler (born February 6, 1982) is a Swedish former professional ice hockey defenceman. Adler most recently played with Tullinge TP in the Swedish League III during the 2010-11 season.

References

External links

1982 births
Huddinge IK players
Living people
Swedish ice hockey defencemen
Ice hockey people from Stockholm